A photonics mast (or optronics mast) is a sensor on a submarine which functions similarly to a periscope without requiring a periscope tube, thus freeing design space during construction and limiting risks of water leakage in the event of damage. A photonics mast replaces the mechanical, line-of-sight viewing system with digital equipment, similar to a digital camera array, and it has fewer locational and dimensional constraints than a traditional periscope.

Unlike a periscope, it needs not be located directly above its user, and it requires only a small pressure hull penetration for cabling. This allows the photonics mast to fit entirely within the sail of the submarine and means the control room need not be placed directly below the sail.

A photonics mast operates by rising above the water in a manner similar to a telescoping antenna and provides information through an array of sensors, such as high-definition low-light and thermographic cameras. Images and information can appear on display panels for analysis. The photonics mast can also support the navigation, electronic warfare, and communications functions of a conventional optical-periscope mast.

Photonics masts by country

Chinese Navy

At least the Type 039B/C submarines are fitted with photonics masts.

French Navy
The Marine Nationale's new nuclear attack submarines, the Suffren class, comes with an optronics mast with the following sensors:

 High resolution day camera
 3rd generation MWIR camera in 3-5 µm band
 Low light level camera (LLLTV) for night use in the visible spectrum with anti-glare system
 Laser rangefinder

The mast is manufactured by Sagem (now Safran). The same mast can be found on the export oriented  conventional attack submarines made by Naval Group.

Japan Maritime Self-Defense Force
The Sōryū-class submarine is equipped with the CM010 optronics mast.

Royal Navy

 nuclear attack submarines are equipped with two Thales CM010 optronics mast similar in capabilities to the Sagem model in French use.

Russian Navy
The Yasen and Borei-class submarines are fitted with photonics masts developed by Shvabe, a subsidiary of Rostec. The Elektropribor Central Research Institute has also developed the Parus-98 photonics mast for the conventional Lada-class submarines and the export market (Parus-98E).

United States Navy

In 2004, the United States Navy began fitting photonics masts to s.

According to the US Navy:
In Virginia-class boats, traditional periscopes have been supplanted by two Photonics Masts that house color, high-resolution black and white, and infrared digital cameras atop telescoping arms. With the removal of the barrel periscopes, the ships’ control room has been moved down one deck and away from the hull’s curvature, affording it more room and an improved layout that provides the commanding officer with enhanced situational awareness.

References

External links

US Navy Fact Sheet, Attack Submarines
How Photonics Masts Will Work - from HowStuffWorks

Submarine design
Optoelectronics
Submarine components